The 1992 Washington State Cougars football team was an American football team that represented Washington State University in the Pacific-10 Conference (Pac-10) during the 1992 NCAA Division I-A football season. In their fourth season under head coach Mike Price, the Cougars were 8–3 in the regular season (5–3 in Pac-10, tied for third), won their bowl game, and outscored their opponents 337 to 281.

The team's statistical leaders included Drew Bledsoe with 3,246 passing yards, Shaumbe Wright-Fair with 1,331 rushing yards, and C. J. Davis with 1,024 receiving yards.

Home games were played on campus at Martin Stadium in Pullman.

Washington State opened with six wins, and were thirteenth in the AP poll, but then lost three of four prior to the Apple Cup. A fourteen-point home underdog to fifth-ranked Washington, the Cougars pulled off a classic blowout upset in the snow, scoring 29 unanswered points in the third quarter, and won 42–23 in the 20-year-old Bledsoe's last game at Martin Stadium. WSU won the Copper Bowl by three over unranked Utah, and climbed to fifteenth in the final rankings.

Bledsoe opted not to play his senior season (1993) and was the first overall selection of the 1993 NFL Draft.

Schedule

Roster

Rankings

Season summary

at Stanford

Washington

The Snow Bowl
Bledsoe 18/28, 260 Yds
Wright-Fair 22 Rush, 193 Yds

vs. Utah (Copper Bowl

NFL Draft
Three Cougars were selected in the 1993 NFL Draft; Bledsoe was the first overall selection.

References

Washington State
Washington State Cougars football seasons
Guaranteed Rate Bowl champion seasons
Washington State Cougars football